Kariya or Vinahə (Vìnà Hə̀), is an Afroasiatic language spoken in a cluster of villages near the Stone Age archaeological site of Kariya Wuro in Ganjuwa LGA, Bauchi State, Nigeria. The ethnic group is known as Wììhə́.

The Wiihə people have a highly rich and complex ritual culture that includes elaborate masquerades, a circumcision ceremony known as sár, a ritual calendar, and so on.

Distribution
Speakers live in the two main settlements of Kariya Gyada and Tulu. There are also speakers in the nearby villages of Sabon Kariya and Sabon Tulu. The settlement of Dutsen Giwa used to have Vinahə speakers, but it is now Hausa-speaking.

Clans
Wiihə clans and their respective founders and shrines:

References

Languages of Nigeria
West Chadic languages